The Tuzo Wilson Seamounts, also called J. Tuzo Wilson Knolls and Tuzo Wilson Knolls, are two young active submarine volcanoes off the coast of British Columbia, Canada, located  northwest of Vancouver Island and south of the Haida Gwaii archipelago (briefly known as the Queen Charlotte Islands.) They are named after Canadian geologist John Tuzo Wilson.

Geology
The two submarine volcanoes are capped by hawaiite and are surrounded by numerous smaller vents, with a total edifice volume of about 12 km3.

The lava emitted in eruptions at the Tuzo Wilson Seamounts is made of basalt, a common gray to black or dark brown extrusive volcanic rock low in silica content (the lava is mafic) that is usually fine-grained due to rapid cooling of lava. Glassy pillow lava is found at the seamounts, a type of rock typically formed when basaltic lava emerges from a submarine volcanic vent. The viscous lava gains a solid crust on contact with the water, and this crust cracks and oozes additional large blobs or "pillows" as more lava emerges from the advancing flow.

The origin of the Tuzo Wilson Seamounts is not without controversy. Some geologists theorize that the Tuzo Wilson Seamounts are linked with a hotspot because lava at the Tuzo Wilson Seamounts are fresh, glassy pillow basalts of recent age, as expected if these seamounts are located above or close to a hotspot south of the Haida Gwaii archipelago. Others prefer rifting as the cause of volcanism because the seamounts are close to the Explorer spreading center. No theory is close to airtight. Part of the controversy is due to the uncertain origin of the Kodiak-Bowie Seamount chain. If a mantle plume was responsible for activity at both seamounts, then it is likely that there would be evidence for alkaline volcanic activity in the area between these two seamounts.

See also
Geology of the Pacific Northwest
List of volcanoes in Canada
Volcanology of Canada
Volcanology of Western Canada

References

Submarine volcanoes
Seamounts of the Pacific Ocean
Volcanoes of British Columbia
Hotspot volcanoes
Ridge volcanoes
Central Coast of British Columbia
Active volcanoes
Seamounts of Canada